"Abalele" is a South African amapiano song produced by Kabza de Small and DJ Maphorisa, featuring the vocals of Ami Faku. It was released on September 17, 2021,  and became a hit in its South Africa, topping the Apple Music charts and becoming the country's fourth most-streamed song of 2021 on Spotify.

NPR described it as "a lover asking for forgiveness, and it's a perfect specimen of amapiano - smooth, chill house beats that build into the genre's signature log drums."

Accolades 

!
|-
|rowspan=2|2022
|<div style="text-align: center;"> "Abalele"
|Record of the Year 
|
| 
|-
| "Abalele
| Most Streamed Song of the Year 
| 
|

References 

2021 songs
House music songs
2021 singles
Number-one singles in South Africa